Newark Union Burial Ground is a cemetery in Brandywine Hundred, Delaware near Carrcroft. Established in 1687, the cemetery is four acres in size and contains approximately 950 graves, including seven men who fought in the American Revolution and members of some the earliest settlers of the Brandywine Hundred. The cemetery is located less than a mile from the Washington-Rochambeau Revolutionary Route through Delaware. The vacant Newark Union Church sits adjacent to the cemetery. It started as a Quaker meetinghouse but became a Methodist Episcopal church in 1845. Both the church and cemetery are listed on the National Register of Historic Places in 2020.

History

Quaker settlers in the Brandywine Hundred began to hold Friends meetings at the homes of various members and were formally recognized in 1684 by the Quarterly Meeting in Philadelphia. In 1687, Valentine Hollingsworth donated land for a Quaker meetinghouse and burial ground. The first building was made of poplar logs and lasted for sixty years. Members of Hollingsworth's family hosted the Quaker Meeting in their home adjacent to the burial ground until the death of Valentine's daughter Catherine and her husband George Robinson. When the Newark Meeting closed in 1754, the cemetery took the name "Newark Free Burial Ground".

Part of the wall surrounding the cemetery dates to 1787, when Charles Robinson, Valentine's great-grandson, carved his initials into one of the stones.

After the war, the property fell into neglect for more than half a century. In 1845, neighbors raised money to build a stone wall around the cemetery and erect a non-denominational church, called Newark Union Church. In 1888, the church was adopted into the Methodist Episcopal Conference, and took the name Newark Union M. E. Church; the building was subsequently remodeled in 1906.

The cemetery and now-vacant church are maintained by a voluntary, self-perpetuating board of trustees which allows burial for Brandywine Hundred residents.

Notable burials
 Valentine Hollingsworth (1632–1710)

The cemetery contains the burials of seven men who fought in the American Revolutionary War.
 Thomas Babb
 Thomas Cartmell
 Elijah Davis
 Andrew Gibson
 Eli Weldin
 George Weldin
 Jacob Weldin

The cemetery also contains the burials of several early settlers of the Brandywine Hundred including:
 Edward, Henry and John Beeson
 William Forwood
 Richard G. Hanby
 John F. Sharpley
 William Talley
 Jacob R. Weldin

References

External links
 Newark Union Church & Cemetery website

1687 establishments in the Thirteen Colonies
Cemeteries on the National Register of Historic Places in Delaware
Churches in New Castle County, Delaware
Churches on the National Register of Historic Places in Delaware
Methodist Episcopal churches in the United States
Quaker meeting houses in Delaware